Highway 2 is a provincial highway in the Canadian province of Saskatchewan. It is the longest highway in Saskatchewan at 809 km (503 mi). The highway is partially divided and undivided.  However, only about  near Moose Jaw,  near Chamberlain, and  near Prince Albert are divided highway. Highway 2 is a major north-south route beginning at the Canada–US border at the Port of West Poplar River and Opheim, Montana customs checkpoints. Montana Highway 24 continues south. It passes through the major cities of Moose Jaw in the south and Prince Albert in the north. Highway 2 overlaps Highway 11 between the towns of Chamberlain and Findlater. This  section of road is a wrong-way concurrency. The highway ends at La Ronge, where it becomes Highway 102.

The highway started as a graded road in the 1920s which followed the grid lines of the early survey system and was maintained by early homesteaders of each rural municipality. Paving projects of the 1950s created all weather roads. Technological advances have paved the way for cost-effective methods of improvements to highway surfaces to meet the wear and tear of increased tourist and commercial highway traffic. The stretch of Highway 2 from Moose Jaw to Prince Albert was designated in 2005 as Veterans Memorial Highway. The designation coincided with Veterans Week 2005.  The CanAm Highway comprises Saskatchewan Highways 35, 39, 6, 3, and 2.

Route description

Saskatchewan Highway 2 departs the Canada–United States border in a northerly direction. Montana Highway 24 continues in a southerly direction in the United States. The United States border crossing is in Opheim, Montana and the Canadian is at West Poplar River.  
Nearby there are campgrounds available, and a point of information regarding the crossing of Poplar River. The area is rich in history, this is the Big Muddy Badlands area which featured the hideouts of outlaws and rum runners of the nineteenth and early twentieth century. This area remained above the Quaternary age ice sheets, being pushed and folded by the glacier movement resulting in glaciotectonic hills. The highway winds up, down and around these hills along the way. The Big Muddy Badlands are within the Missouri Coteau. At km 12 the highway reaches Kildeer, and the intersection with Highway 18. This section of Highway 2 begins as a Class 4 highway and is under the jurisdiction of the Saskatchewan Highways and Transportation (SHT) South West Transportation Planning Council. The highway is a secondary weight highway with a thin membrane surface type as it only has an average of 390 vehicles per day (vpd) according to the 2007 Average Annual Daily Traffic (AADT) count which was taken north of Rockglen. Highway 2 begins a concurrency with Highway 18 in a north-easterly direction. Alfalfa and alfalfa mixtures, hay and fodder crops and spring wheat are the main crops in Old Post rural municipality (RM). There is a point of information at km 42. This area is known as the Wood Mountain Uplands where there are mining endeavours undertaken such as coal, bentonite, kaolinitic, and ceramic clays. Paleontological digs have uncovered a 63-million-year-old sea turtle which has been excavated in the Killdeer region. Rockglen is located at km 49, and Highway 2 now extends in a northerly direction again. Rockglen (Population 450 in 2001 and 360 in 2006 ) and Assiniboia ( 2,483 in 2001 and 2,305 in 2006 ) are the two largest centres between the border and the city of Moose Jaw. This geographical region of Highway 2 from Rockglen to Assiniboia has been upgraded to a Class 3 highway as it carries approximately 800 vehicles per day counted to the south of Assiniboia. Therefore, the surface type before Assiniboia is a granular road surface which is a structural pavement with a hot mix surface coating. The highway type, surface, maintenance and construction projects are looked after by the SHS South Central Traffic Planning Committee. Fife Lake is located to the north east of the highway. These unique petroglyph features carved into the sandstone are slowly disappearing. At km 103 is the town of Assiniboia where 1,260 vpd results in the highway designated as an asphalt concrete (AS) Class 2 primary weight highway all the way to Moose Jaw. Junction with Highway 13, the Red Coat Trail occurs at km 103, providing access to Lafleche. Vantage is located to the west of the highway along this stretch, with access provided at km 128. Mossbank is located at the intersection with Highway 718. Here is the south-east portion of Old Wives Lake, which is a part of the Chaplin, Old Wives Lake, Reed Lakes (Hemispheric) - Western Hemisphere Shorebird Reserve Network (WHSRN) Site, a designated Hemispheric Shorebird Reserve Network, protecting three saline lakes, saline and freshwater marshes. Ardill is located near the northern extremity of Lake of the Rivers. Highway 36 is located at km 175, which provides access to Crestwynd, and the Jean Louis Legare Regional Park. At km 183, is the junction with Highway 716 west providing access to Briercrest.

Veteran's Memorial Highway
 The home of the Snowbirds, the Canadian Forces 431 Air Demonstration Squadron is at CFB Moose Jaw, Bushell Park at the km 202 junction with Highway 363. Before entering the city of Moose Jaw is an  divided or twinned highway section. Highway 2 becomes an urban couplet for 1 km before going through the centre of the city. Moose Jaw, a city of 32,132 features large roadside attractions such as Capone's Car, Moose Family, and Mac the moose. Temple Gardens Mineral Spa Resort, Tunnels of Moose Jaw, and History of Transportation Western Development Museum. are major sites of interest of this city. 
The Saskatchewan Highway 1 intersection with Highway 2 is north of Moose Jaw. At km 226, access to Buffalo Pound Provincial Park is provided to the east of Highway 2 by traveling another . Access to the small town of Tuxford is provided at km 230, at the Highway 42 junction. The SHS Central Area Transportation Planning Committee monitors this primary weight highway between Moose Jaw and Meacham. Between the two national highway systems of the Trans Canada Saskatchewan Highway 1 and Saskatchewan Highway 11, Highway 2 is also designated as a Class 1 AC national connector highway. There is a point of information on the south side of the Qu'Appelle Valley while second point of information is on the northern bank of the Qu'Appelle Valley. Buffalo Pound Lake, a eutrophic prairie lake was formed by glaciation 10,000 years ago. At the junction of highway 11, is the town of Chamberlain where the highway which travels north begins a south-east  wrong-way concurrency at Chamberlain. Where these two national highways overlap, a divided highway segment handles the AADT which is about 4500 vpd. Arm River Recreation Site is south of Chamberlain with an historical marker. To the west of the highway are afforded views of the Arm River Valley. At km 275, the highway takes a sharp turn to continue north as it leaves the Highway 11 concurrency. After the concurrency, Highway 2 is a class 3 AC primary weight highway until Watrous. The junction of Highway 733 in  provides access to Last Mountain Lake travelling east. Holdfast is accessed at the Highway 732 junction. Penzance is east of the highway at km 305; Liberty is a small community at km 314.  Located near Stalwart is the Stalwart National Wildlife Area, a wetlands region. Watertown (1903–1910) provides easy access to Etter's Beach on Last Mountain Lake. The settlers of Watertown established a post office named Harkness Post Office, Assiniboia, North-West Territories. With the arrival of the rail, the village became known as Imperial. The town of Imperial is the largest centre west of Last Mountain Lake with a population around 300 and an AADT of close to 650 vpd. The village of Simpson is also along the highway which runs parallel to Last Mountain Lake. There are several roadside turnouts to access Last Mountain Lake from Highway 2. The Last Mountain Lake Bird Sanctuary was the first bird sanctuary in North America. Highway 15 provides access to Nokomis to the east, and Kenaston to the west.  The small hamlet of Amazon is located before Watrous. Watrous is a tourist destination due to its proximity to Manitou Beach and the endorheic Little Manitou Lake. Watrous, in the Land of Living Waters, is a tourist destination due to its proximity to Manitou Beach, home of the world-famous Mineral Spa and Danceland dance hall (known as the "Home of the World Famous Dance Floor Built on Horsehair"). The AADT near this tourist town of 1,800 people raises to about 1,250 vpd which ranks it as a class 2 highway. Highway 2 continues in a north-west direction to circumnavigate around Little Manitou until it gets to the Young and the junction of Highway 670. Young and Zelma were two communities that were part of the alphabet railway of the Canadian National Railway (CNR).  The Yellowhead Highway is at km 419. Colonsay is located to the west, and Plunkett to the east. Colonsay is the location of one of several potash mines in Saskatchewan, a major employer of the region. Potash evaporites were laid down during the geological formation of the Western Canadian Sedimentary Basin. The SHS North Central Transportation Planning Committee tends to highway maintenance and construction decisions north of the Yellowhead highway. Highway 2 from the Yellowhead through to Prince Albert is a class 2 primary weight AC highway.  Over 1,000 vehicles travel Highway 2 between Watrous and Meacham, and of these less than 100 of them are trucks. The majority of commercial trucks near the Highway 2 and 5 intersection travel Highway 5. The AADT after the intersection is under 350 vpd.
Highway 5 provides access to the city of Saskatoon, the largest city in the province. There is a  concurrency between Highway 5 and 2 upon which there are close to 2,000 vpd. Highway 5 east provides access to the city of Humboldt. Meacham at km 435 is located in the  Aspen Parkland ecoregion.  Throughout the Aspen Parkland ecoregion are trembling aspen (Populus tremuloides ) bluffs (small islands or shelter belts) within the prairie region. Deer and other large ungulates are a hazard to traffic resulting in potential animal or human deaths, especially in the autumn mating months or when deer are searching for feeding grounds in the spring. The defence mechanism of deer in the face of a threat is to freeze. There are over 3,500 deer - auto collisions per year in Saskatchewan. A number of measures have been implemented to increase awareness such as fencing, feeding programs, and automobile whistles. Deer mirrors along the edges of highways were installed for reducing deer-vehicle collisions. The Wildlife Warning System is triggered by highway vehicles, setting off lights, sounds and or odours ahead of the approaching vehicle to frighten away animals. Some systems that detect vehicles, where others detect large animals and sets off a warning system to drivers of vehicles alerting them that an animal is on or near the highway ahead of time. The junction with Highway 27 occurs at km 460 providing access west to the village of Prud'homme and off to the east is Muskiki Lake. Cudworth is located at the Highway 777 intersection, bearing east on highway 777 provides access to Middle Lake. The intersection of Highway 41 is located at Wakaw, which features a golf course, campground, and regional park at Wakaw Lake. The community considered a proposal to construct a canal between the lake and the town to be developed into a marina - resort - tourism area.  Traffic around this tourist town of 864 increases between 650 and 1050 vpd.  
  At the junction of Highway 25 is the town of St. Louis where there is a historical paranormal phenomenon called the St. Louis Light or the St. Louis Ghost Train.  Domremy, located at the junction of Highway 320 and Highway 225, constructed a park to commemorate the province's centennial celebrations. Highway 225 provides access to the Batoche National Historical Site, which was the site of the last stand of Metis rights activist Louis Riel prior to his subsequent trial and death in 1885.  St. Louis was recently the site of the discovery of a large archaeological site of aboriginal artifacts.   The South Saskatchewan River was originally crossed at this point via the St. Louis Bridge, but the highway now bypasses the village several kilometres to the east via a newly constructed bridge. Traffic around St. Louis averaged about 1,500 and escalates to 6,000 after the junction with Highway 11 (the Louis Riel Trail), which occurs 4 km south of Prince Albert at km 553.

CanAm Highway
Highway 3 joins with Highway 2 at km 559, becoming a concurrency for  After crossing the North Saskatchewan River the concurrency of Highway 2 and 3 end at the interchange with Highway 55. There is an  divided or twinned highway segment north of Prince Albert. Highway 2 continues northward as an AC primary weight CanAm international highway from this point northward taking over from the highway 3 segment. Prince Albert, a city of over 34,000, is a part of the boreal transition ecoregion, agricultural fields and forested areas border the highway rural areas. At km 581, Highway 2 meets with the intersection of Highway 355. To the north-west of this intersection is Little Red River Indian Reserve 106C and Montreal Lake 106B Indian Reserves. Christopher Lake is at the km 594 junction of Highway 791 east and Highway 263 west. Highway 263 provides access to the Prince Albert National Park.  This ecoregion is a part of the mid-boreal upland. At km 634, Highway 2 meets with Highway 264 which provides access to Waskesiu Lake in the Prince Albert National Park. At km 648 there is an intersection with Highway 969, another access to the Park westerly, and eastern access to Montreal Lake 106 Indian Reserve. There are fewer roads in the southern boreal forest. Highway 2 makes the next highway connection at km 680 with Highway 916.

There are over 100,000 lakes across Saskatchewan, with the main lake region being north of the tree line in the Canadian Shield. Montreal Lake is located west of Highway 2, its northern shores near Weyakwin at km 704, then at km 746 Highway 2 meets with Highway 165 which travels north to Morin Lake 217 Indian Reserve. Lac la Ronge 156 Indian Reserve is at km 798 before the ending terminus in the northern boreal forest at La Ronge and the junction with Highway 102.

History
From 1876, the South Saskatchewan river crossing at St. Louis was via ferry. In 1912, the railway built a rail bridge across the river, and in 1928, the vehicle lanes were added. After 1907, the highway was constructed south of Chamberlain and reached Buffalo Pound. At this time two horse scrapers and walking plows were the implements of road construction technology. This highway received an improvement in 1926 which then used an elevating grader, 16 horses and a dump wagon.

The Saskatchewan Highway Act was established in 1922, in compliance with the 1919 Canadian highway act. At the initial stages of the Saskatchewan Highway Act,  of highway were gravel and the rest were earth roads. The road allowances were laid out as a part of the Dominion Land survey system for homesteading.  In 1929, the R.M. of Wood Creek #281 conducted roadwork with three graders, 53 slush scrapers, 15 wheel scrapers and five ploughs.  Development of highways began in the 1920s and was virtually halted in the depression years of the 1930s. Early homesteaders, such as John Abrey, would do road maintenance work themselves in this era. In the 1930s seeing a car was rare, Alexander Black remembers taking 150 bushels on a grain tank with a four horse hitch. When they reached highway 2, the horses bolted through town until they snagged on the railway switch by the elevators. Travel along the Provincial Highway 5 before the 1940s would have been traveling on the square following the township road allowances, barbed wire fencing and rail lines. As the surveyed township roads were the easiest to travel, the first highway was designed on 90-degree, right-angle corners as the distance traversed the prairie along range roads and township roads.

The two industrial revolutions first and second combined with advancements made during the war years resulted in the largest impetus in highway construction of all weather roads following World War II.  The creation of the highway south of Chamberlain to Moose Jaw was completed in 1953. Paving projects followed within a short time period.  In 1955 parts of Highway 2 were already paved; Between Vantage and Tuxford, either side of Moose Jaw; north of Watrous along the Little Manitou Lake shoreline; and north of the junction with Highway 27 to Montreal Lake, either side of Prince Albert. In 1956 a North-South International Highway proposal regarding a highway between El Paso, Texas, and LaRonge via Wakaw was discussed. The CanAm Highway northern segment into La Ronge finished construction in 1977; however, the CanAm didn't go through Wakaw, rather it comprised several different routes making the CanAm. Highway 2, which does go through Wakaw, does link to the CanAm highway at Prince Albert when Highway 2 becomes the last portion of the CanAm highway. In 1952, Highway 2 was re-routed; rather than winding its way through the town of Wakaw, the highway's new route went straight along the western limit of town.

Agriculture is Saskatchewan's main industry and taking grain to elevators was first accomplished by horse and cart, to be replaced around World War I by truck travel. Long haul trucking flourished between 1950 and 1970. Since the 1970s, 17 times the number of grain trucks and 95 percent of goods transported now are hauled by truck across the Saskatchewan.

In 1999, the granular pavement section of Highway 2 south of Watrous was tested with a cold in-place recycling or “CIR” method to rehabilitate highways. This CIR process is a cost-effective method which recycles the top surface of a road. This pulverized material is mixed with asphalt emulsion and spread and compacted back onto the highway surface. This surface is then recovered with a new seal dependent on traffic volume.

In 2001,  were resurfaced near the Cudworth access road, as well  km north of the Highway 27 junction. "Highway 2 near Cudworth has seen an increase in truck traffic that is leading to deterioration on this highway...It's important to keep our highways in good driving condition to ensure the safety of the travelling public." -Highways and Transportation Minister Maynard Sonntag. At km 398 is access to Zelma.  
'Highway 2 has seen an increase in truck traffic, leading to wear and tear on this highway...We are paving a section of this highway as it has deteriorated over the past number of years. Saskatchewan Highways and Transportation is working hard to fix roads across the province to improve driver safety. - " Highways and Transportation Minister Mark Wartman

Veterans Memorial Highway
Veterans Memorial Highway is the official name of Highway 2 between Moose Jaw and Prince Albert. As a tribute to Saskatchewan veterans, Premier Lorne Calvert, Highways and Transportation Minister Eldon Lautermilch and Past Provincial President of the Royal Canadian Legion, Saskatchewan Command, John Henderson together unveiled the new highway sign on November 10, 2005. The ceremony was held during veteran's week, November 5–11th, and also commemorates The Year of the Veteran, 2005. The highway designation coincides with Veterans Week (November 5–11) and was one of several significant honours bestowed to veterans in 2005, The Year of the Veteran. The Year of the Veteran commemorates the 60th Anniversary of the end of the World War II. The Royal Canadian Legion, Saskatchewan Command and Saskatchewan Remembers Committee came together to select this particular highway of Saskatchewan because of the history of a military presence along the route. Royal Canadian Legion branches are located at Moose Jaw, Penance - Holdfast, Young - Zelma, Watrous, Simpson, and Prince Albert. A military history museum is located at the Watrous, as well military memorabilia is held at Prince Albert Royal Canadian Legion branch.

CanAm Highway
The northern  of Saskatchewan Highway 2 contribute to the CanAm Highway. The Highway 2 segment designated as the CanAm Highway is located between Prince Albert and La Ronge. The North American Free Trade Agreement (NAFTA) super corridors connect Mexico, United States, and Canada. The CanAm highway was a concept that began in the 1920s. A stretch of highway between Amazon and Watrous is slated for maintenance between 208 and 2009, as well as the Highway 5 - Highway 2 concurrency which carries about 2,000 vpd on average through the year. Also the  segment between Highways 264 and 969 is a 2008-09 maintenance project.

Major intersections
From south to north.

See also

References

Further reading
Volumes 1 and 2 of the books "The Rolling Hills of Home"
Title 	Histoire de Saint-Louis, Saskatchewan et des environs Published [Saskatchewan : s.n.], 1980 (Saskatchewan? : Impr. La Prairie)  By the Committee of the Local History of St. Louis; under direction of Marie-Madeleine Tournier Also published in English under title: I remember: a history of St. Louis and surrounding areas Other Authors Tournier, Marie-Madeleine Saint Louis Local History Committee
Title I remember: a history of St. Louis and surrounding areas Published 	Saint Louis, Sask. : Saint Louis Local History Committee, 1980 Other Authors 	Saint Louis Local History Committee

External links

Saskatchewan Highways Website
2001 Community Profiles Old Post RM
Community Profiles from the 2006 Census, Statistics Canada Willow Bunch RM
Community Profiles from the 2006 Census, Statistics Canada Stonehenge RM
Buffalo Pound Provincial Park
Lac La Ronge Provincial Park

Monuments and memorials in Saskatchewan
002
Transport in Moose Jaw
Transport in Prince Albert, Saskatchewan